The Military ranks of Azerbaijan are the military insignia used by the Azerbaijani Armed Forces.  Being a former member of Soviet Union, Azerbaijan shares a rank structure similar to that of Russia; however, the insignia used for its ranks had been increasingly being influenced by Turkey.

Commissioned officer ranks
The rank insignia of commissioned officers.

Other ranks
The rank insignia of non-commissioned officers and enlisted personnel.

Enlisted (1990-2001) 

The rank insignia for NCOs and enlisted personnel from 1990 to 2001.

References

External links